Jai Kaali is a 1992 Hindi-language horror film, produced by Satram Rohra on Bhagyalaxmi Chitra Mandir's banner and directed by Nikhil Saini. Starring Jeetendra, Hema Malini  and music composed by Usha Khanna.

Plot
Girnar a remote forest area of our country, where the tribal inhabitants (Adivasis) work as bonded labourers in the stone quarry owned by Bankelal Chaurasia (Saeed Jaffrey), who along with collector of the area Purushttoma Desai (Paresh Rawal), the forest officer Ranjeet (Ranjeet), Daljit Singh (Bharat Kapoor) and Mukkadam Sumba (Sadashiv Amrapurkar) have been exploiting and terrorizing the poor tribals. Shikari (Hema Malini) a popular writer comes from the city to write a book on these tribals, who becomes a threat to the authority of the evil foursome when she starts exposing the inhuman conditions the poor were going through. The ultimate attack comes when she discovers the body of Divya (Zarina Wahab) a local girl who was raped and killed by the gang of four. Facing the insecurity of their names and positions they names and positions they decide to eliminate Shikaali is beaten to near death. He invokes the Goddess "Kaali" who takes a human form in the body of the unknowing Shikaali. Towards the end, Bankelal, Purushottam, Daljit, and Sumba are hacked to death by the goddess in the form of Shikaali. Good triumphs over evil. Shikaali is accused of Killing. Advocate Shiv Shankar (Jeetendra) who was in love with Shikari also a friend comes to her rescue and ultimately proves her innocence. The court is forced to acquit Shikaali of all charges.

Cast
Jeetendra as Adovocate Shiv Shankar
Hema Malini as Shikaali
Saeed Jaffrey as Bankelal Chaurasia
Sadashiv Amrapurkar as Mukkadam Sumba
Paresh Rawal as Purushottam Desi
Ranjeet as Shikari Ranjeet
Rajesh Vivek as Poojari Baba
Vikas Anand
Bharat Kapoor as Daljit Singh
Subbiraj as Judge
Zarina Wahab as Divya
Aruna Irani

Soundtrack 
Lyricist: Yogesh and Nida Fazli

References

External links
 

1990s Hindi-language films
1990s horror thriller films
Films scored by Usha Khanna
Indian horror thriller films
1992 horror films
1992 films
Indian fantasy films
1992 fantasy films